Fred Joerger (1913-2005) was one of Disneyland's original model makers, or "imagineers". He was recruited from Warner Bros by Walt Disney himself in 1953, and created models for most of Disneyland's original attractions, including the steamboat Mark Twain, Main Street, the Matterhorn and the Sleeping Beauty Castle. 

Joerger was born in Illinois in 1913. He graduated from the University of Illinois at Chicago with a fine arts degree in 1937. He was named a Disney Legend in 2001. He died in 2005.

References

1) Nelson, Valerie J. (2005-09-05). "Fred Joerger, 91; Model Maker, 'Imagineer' for Disneyland Attractions" Los Angeles Times. Retrieved 2017-07-27.

(2) Bonner, Marcel and Stephen Daly. "Remembering Fred Joerger: Master of Miniatures and Mountains." The "E" Ticket, Summer 2006, pp.6-17.

(3) Kurtti, Jeff. Walt Disney's Imagineering Legends, and the Genesis of the Disney Theme Park. New York: Disney Editions, 2008.

(4) (2005-09-06). "Fred Joerger, 91, Disney Artist" The Washington Times. Retrieved 2017-08-03.

(5) "Samland Presents...Where's the Window???, Part 1" micechat.com (2011-4-13) Retrieved 2017-08-06.

(6) Leibacher, Herb. (2012-05-30) "The Meaning Behind the Haunted Mansion Tombstones" worldofwalt.com. Retrieved 2017-08-06.

1913 births
2005 deaths
Disney imagineers
University of Illinois Chicago alumni
Artists from Illinois